Momtaz Uddin (February 1946 – 6 June 2003) was a Bangladesh Awami League politician who served as a member of Jatiya Sangsad representing the Natore-1 constituency. He was the senior vice president of the district Awami League. He was a member of Mukti Bahini in Bangladesh Liberation war in 1971, commander in chief of Lalpur.

Assassination
On 6 June 2003, local Natore police stated that a band of 10 armed men interrupted Uddin's motorcycle at Darpara on the Goapalpur-Abdulpur Road in Natore and stabbed him to death.

On 13 March 2013, a speedy trial tribunal in Rajshahi sentenced nine people to life in prison for killing Uddin.

References

2003 deaths
Awami League politicians
3rd Jatiya Sangsad members
Date of birth missing
Place of birth missing
Mukti Bahini personnel